GWAS may refer to:

Genome-wide association study, study of mutations' correlations with disease or other phenotypic expressions
gwas, a Welsh term for a valet
Great Western Ambulance Service, the ambulance service serving Somerset, Gloucestershire and Wiltshire.
An online gaming abbreviation for "Game was a success".